Yaroslav Oreshkevich (born 8 September 2000) is a Belarusian professional footballer who plays for BATE Borisov.

References

External links 
 
 

2000 births
Living people
Sportspeople from Brest, Belarus
Belarusian footballers
Association football midfielders
FC Dynamo Brest players
FC Rukh Brest players
FC BATE Borisov players